Marian Andrzej Dudziak (born 2 February 1941) was a Polish sprinter who specialized in the 100 metres.

He was born in Wielichowo and represented the clubs Orkan Poznań and Olimpia Poznań. At the 1964 Summer Olympics he won a silver medal in the 4 x 100 metres relay with teammates Andrzej Zieliński, Wiesław Maniak and Marian Foik. He also competed in the 100 metres event, reaching the quarter-final. He achieved his personal best time in the 100 metres in the same year; 10.2 seconds with handtiming.

He won an individual silver medal in 200 metres at the 1966 European Championships. At the 1967 European Indoor Games he finished fifth in the 50 metres race. He also competed in the relay final, but the team did not finish. At the 1968 European Indoor Games he won a silver medal in the medley relay, which he ran with Edmund Borowski, Waldemar Korycki and Andrzej Badeński. At the 1968 Summer Olympics he finished eighth in the 4 x 100 metres relay and reached the quarter-final in the 100 metres event. At the 1971 European Championships he won a silver medal in the 4 x 100 metres relay together with Gerard Gramse, Tadeusz Cuch and Zenon Nowosz.

He became Polish 100 metres champion in 1968 and 200 metres champion in 1966.

References

1941 births
Living people
Polish male sprinters
Olympic silver medalists for Poland
Athletes (track and field) at the 1964 Summer Olympics
Athletes (track and field) at the 1968 Summer Olympics
Olympic athletes of Poland
People from Grodzisk Wielkopolski County
European Athletics Championships medalists
Sportspeople from Greater Poland Voivodeship
Medalists at the 1964 Summer Olympics
Olympic silver medalists in athletics (track and field)
20th-century Polish people